Lepetodrilus gordensis  is a species of small, deep-sea sea snail, a hydrothermal vent limpet, a marine gastropod mollusk in the family Lepetodrilidae.

Description

Distribution

References

External links
 Extreme adaptation

Lepetodrilidae
Gastropods described in 2006